"Bleed American" is a song by American rock band Jimmy Eat World. It was released in June 2001 as the lead single from their fourth album Bleed American (retitled Jimmy Eat World). The song was originally titled "Bleed American", but similar to the name change of the album after the September 11 attacks, the song was retitled "Salt Sweat Sugar" after the first line in the song's chorus. The song was in the 2001 Clear Channel Memorandum along with other songs.

Music video
The music video features the band playing a live gig, filmed from various angles onstage.

Track listing
CDN promo
 "Bleed American" (album version)
 "Your Home" (mistitled demo rock version)

UK CD
 "Salt Sweat Sugar" (retitled album version)
 "(Splash) Turn, Twist" (non-album)
 "Your House" (demo rock version)
 "Salt Sweat Sugar" (video)

UK 7" vinyl
 "Salt Sweat Sugar" (retitled album version)
 "Your House" (demo rock version)

Charts

References

Jimmy Eat World songs
2001 singles
Post-hardcore songs
2001 songs
DreamWorks Records singles